Robert Mann (born November 22, 1951) is an American professional golfer who played on the PGA Tour from 1977 to 1980.

Early life and education 
Mann was born in Milwaukee, Wisconsin. He graduated from Whitefish Bay High School in 1970. Mann was the 1969–1970 Wisconsin Junior Amateur Champion and earned a scholarship to Indiana University, where he was co-captain of the 1973 Big Ten Championship golf team. He majored in marketing and advertising and was graduated with a bachelor's degree.

Career 
Mann began his career as a professional golfer in 1974.

As a PGA Tour player, Mann had a handful of top-10 finishes, including a win at the 1978 Walt Disney World National Team Championship with playing partner Wayne Levi. His best finish in a major was tied for 51st place at the 1979 PGA Championship.

After retiring from the PGA Tour, Mann became the head club pro at Valle Vista Country Club in Indianapolis, a position he held for 10 years. Since 1991, he has served as head golf pro at Little Turtle Country Club in Westerville, Ohio, a suburb of Columbus.

He won the 1994–1995 Southern Ohio PGA Player of the Year award, and the 2004 Southern Ohio Senior PGA Player of the Year award. He lives in Columbus.

Amateur wins 
1969 Wisconsin Junior Amateur
1970 Wisconsin Junior Amateur

Professional wins (4)

PGA Tour wins (1)

Other wins (2)
1981 Indiana PGA Championship
1982 Indiana PGA Championship

Senior wins (1)
2005 Senior Stroke Play Championship

References

External links

American male golfers
Indiana Hoosiers men's golfers
PGA Tour golfers
Golfers from Wisconsin
Golfers from Columbus, Ohio
Sportspeople from Milwaukee
1951 births
Living people